Issa Diop may refer to:

 Issa (Senegalese singer), born Issa Diop, singer, songwriter, and record producer
 Issa Diop (footballer) (born 1997), French footballer
 Issa Rae, born Jo-Issa Rae Diop, actress, writer, and producer.